Za trnkovým keřem is a 1980 Czechoslovak film. The film starred Josef Kemr.

References

External links
 

1980 films
Czechoslovak drama films
1980s Czech-language films
Czech drama films
1980s Czech films